Parassinkkadavu  is a small Temple town in Anthoor Municipality. It is a famous tourist destination in North Malabar.

Attractions
Parassinikkadavu is noted for the famous Muthappan temple where people go for worshipping Sree Muthappan. This is the only Hindu Temple in Kerala where a Theyyam performance is a daily ritual offering.

Tradition has it that for the Annual Festival, Ulsavam, of the Muthappan Temple at Parassinikkadavu  to start, a procession led by a female member of the "Thayyil" clan of Thayyil, Kannur begins from the family home and terminates at the main altar of the temple with a 'pooja' (prayer) to the Gods.

Parassinkkadavu is also noted for the Parassinikkadavu Snake Park which is committed to the preservation and conservation of snakes.  There are about 150 varieties of snakes including the spectacled cobra, King cobra, Russell's viper, Krait and Pit Viper living in the park.

A research laboratory to extract venom from snakes is proposed here.  The park also has a large collection of non-poisonous snakes including pythons.

Vismaya Water Theme park is situated at Parassinikkadavu.

Story of Muthappan Madappura Nileshwar

Several Muthappan Temples are seen in different parts of Kodagu, Kannur and Kasaragod districts. This shows the popularity of the God in the minds of the people of these districts. Each madappura has its own tradition. One interesting story relating to the God Muthappan is about the Nileshwar Muthappan Madappura.

The Sree Muthappan temple near National Highway No 17 in Nileshwar has a rich heritage. It indicates philosophical, devotional and educational importance of Nileshwar. There is an interesting story regarding the construction of Sree Muthappan Temple. An elder member of the Koroth family regularly visited the place now known as the Muthappan temple and drank madhu, a kind of intoxicating drink. He was a famous scholar and got the title Ezhuthachan for his commendable achievement as a teacher. Before drinking madhu, as a devotee he poured several drops of madhu on the nearby jackfruit tree as an offering for the god Muthappan. He regularly repeated the practice. Several years after the death of the above-mentioned scholar the natives found serious problems and they called upon an astrologer for assistance. The astrologer reveal that as a result of the regular practice of giving madhu to the god Muthappan, the God started residing there. After the death of the scholar, he did not get the madhu, and piqued, he started creating disturbances in the area. To placate him, the natives erected a Muthappan temple there. Koroth family got the right of Koymma [ patron] in the temple.

As a result of the formation of a committee and the great work done by the members of the committee the temple became famous, and daily hundreds of people visited there. There is a strong belief that the God will cure all diseases and will give prosperity to the devotees. The devotees will get Payakutti from the temple and stood developing as a great temple like the Sree Muthappan temple at Parassini kadavu.

Photo gallery

See also
Anthoor
Thayyil
Parassinikkadavu Snake Park
Sree Muthappan
Muthappan temple
Kannur
Theyyam
Parassinikkadavu Temple
Kunnathoor Padi
Rajarajeshwara Temple
Sree Muthappan Temple Nileshwar

External links

Orkut Community of Parassinikkadavu

Suburbs of Kannur
Tourism in Kerala